Henri Béraud (21 September 1885 in Lyon – 24 October 1958 in Saint-Clément-des-Baleines, Ré Island), also known as Tristan Audebert, was a French novelist and journalist. He was sentenced to death in 1945, which was later commuted to life imprisonment, for collaboration with Germany.

Life 
Henri Béraud was the son of a baker. In 1903 he began his work in journalism. 
He joined the satirical weekly Le Canard enchaîné in February 1917, recommended by Paul Vaillant-Couturier, and Roland Dorgeles. He renewed his old friendship with Albert Londres. He also wrote for Le Crapouillot, the magazine started by Jean Galtier-Boissiere.
He published stories, a short series (L'angoisse du mercanti ou le compte du tonneau in 1918), a study on  Lyonnais humor, and especially polemical articles. He was also an international reporter at the Petit Parisien and Paris-Soir, from 1934 to 1944.

He later became known as one of France's best-selling novelists and reporters, and won the Prix Goncourt in 1922. He was virulently Anglophobic and to a lesser extent antisemitic. These factors led him to support Vichy France.  He did this by contributing pieces to the fascist weekly paper Gringoire, indicating his hatred of British forces and criticism of the Free French.

Typical of Vichy anti-British propaganda was the widely distributed pamphlet published in August 1940 and written by self-proclaimed "professional Anglophobe" Henri Béraud entitled,  ("Should England Be Reduced to Slavery?"); the question in the title was merely rhetorical. Additionally, Vichy mixed Anglophobia with racism and antisemitism to portray the British as a racially degenerate "mixed race" working for Jewish capitalists, in contrast to the "racially pure" peoples on the continent of Europe who were building a "New Order".

His aid of the Vichy government caused him to be sentenced to death in 1945, but several writers, including François Mauriac intervened on his behalf. The sentence was commuted by Charles de Gaulle to life imprisonment. By 1950 he was freed for health reasons. He died eight years later.

Works

 L'École moderne de peinture lyonnaise (1912)
 Le Vitriol de Lune (1921, prix Goncourt 1922)
 Le Martyre de l'obèse, (prix Goncourt 1922)
 Lazarus, Albin Michel, 1924 (re-published in 2006 by Hippocampus Press together with An Exchange of Souls by Barry Pain, ed.S. T. Joshi)
Ce que j'ai vu à Moscou, Les Éditions de France 1925
Le Bois du templier pendu, Les Éditions de France, 1926
Ce que j'ai vu à Berlin, Les Éditions de France, 1926
La Gerbe d'or, Les Éditions de France, 1928
Ce que j'ai vu à Rome, Les Éditions de France, 1929
Qu’as-tu fait de ta jeunesse? (1941)
Les Lurons de Sabolas (1932)
Ciel de suie (1933)
Faut-il réduire l'Angleterre en esclavage (1935)
Les raisons d'un silence, Inter-France, 1944
Les derniers beaux jours, Plon, 1953
Portraits de contemporains
Retour sentimental vers Alphonse Daudet, 2001
Écrits dans Gringoire (1928–1937), 2003
Au Capucin Gourmand
Le Flâneur salarié
 "Rendez-vous européens, Les Éditions de France, 1928

References

External links
Novo Press

1885 births
1958 deaths
Writers from Lyon
French fascists
20th-century French novelists
20th-century French male writers
Writers from Auvergne-Rhône-Alpes
French military personnel of World War I
French collaborators with Nazi Germany
Prix Goncourt winners
French male novelists
French male non-fiction writers
French prisoners sentenced to death
20th-century French journalists
Prisoners sentenced to death by France